King Xiaowen of Qin (302–250 BC) was a Chinese king, who had a very brief reign. He is also known as Lord Anguo (安國君). His grandson was Emperor Qin Shi Huang.

Biography 
Xiaowen was the second son of the King Zhaoxiang of Qin and Queen Tang, and grandson of Queen Dowager Xuan.

He was a king of the Qin for less than one year, and died three days after his coronation.

Various theories about his short reign have been proposed. The most accepted theory is that he was very old when he ascended to the throne (his father ruled for over 50 years).

However, a conspiracy theory that Lü Buwei poisoned the king, or at least hastened his death, to put the next king, King Zhuangxiang of Qin onto the throne, has been proposed. This is supported in a way by the fact that Zhuangxiang reigned for only 3 years.

Family
Queens:
 Queen Dowager Huayang, of the Xiong lineage of the Mi clan of Chu (296–230 BC), a royal of Chu by birth
 Queen Dowager Xia, of the Xia lineage (300–240 BC), the mother of Crown Prince Yiren

Sons:
 Crown Prince Yiren (281–247 BC), renamed Zichu; ruled as King Zhuangxiang of Qin from 250–247 BC

Ancestry

References

250 BC deaths
3rd-century BC Chinese monarchs
Rulers of Qin
Chinese kings